The following radio stations broadcast on AM frequency 700 kHz: 700 AM is a United States clear channel frequency. WLW Cincinnati and KBYR Anchorage share Class A status of 700 kHz.

In Argentina 
 LV3 in Córdoba, Córdoba.

In Canada
 CJLI in Calgary, Alberta - 50 kW daytime, 20 kW nighttime, transmitter located at

In Guatemala (Channel 17)
TGVB in Guatemala City

In Mexico 
 XEDKR-AM in Guadalajara, Jalisco
 XEETCH-AM in Etchojoa, Sonora
 XEXPUJ-AM in Xpujil, Campeche

In the United States 
Stations in bold are clear-channel stations.

References

Lists of radio stations by frequency